Mordellistena confusa is a beetle in the genus Mordellistena of the family Mordellidae. It was described in 1910 by Willis Blatchley.

References

confusa
Beetles described in 1910
Taxa named by Willis Blatchley